Frederick Hargreaves may refer to:

Fred Hargreaves (1858–1897), English footballer and cricketer
Frederick James Hargreaves (1891–1970), British astronomer and optician